Karnataka's coastline called Karavali stretches 309.59km. between Mangalore in Dakshina Kannada district and Karwar in Uttara Kannada district. Bhatkal is the main centre with around eight beaches . The coastline of Karnataka is along the eastern shore of Arabian Sea.

Karnataka's coastline spans across 3 districts Dakshina Kannada, Udupi and Uttara Kannada.

Dakshina Kannada

Mangalore 
 Panambur Beach
 NITK Beach
 Sasihithlu Beach
 Tannirbhavi Beach
 Someshwar Beach
 Mukka Beach
 Ullal beach
 Kotekar-Beeri Beach
 Batapady Beach
 Bengre Beach
 Mulki Beach

Udupi

Kundapur 
 Maravanthe Beach
 Kodi Beach
 Trasi Beach

Udupi 
 Malpe Beach
 St. Mary's Islands Beach
 Delta Beach
 Kaup Beach
 Padubidri Beach
 Mattu Beach

Uttara Kannada

Karwar 
 Majali Beach
Rabindranath Tagore beach (Karwar)

Ankola 
 Belekeri Beach

Kumta 
 Kadle Beach

Gokarna 
 Kudle beach
 Om beach
 Gokarna beach

Geographic Location

References 

 
Beaches in Karnataka
K
B